The 2017 Georgia Southern Eagles baseball team represented the Georgia Southern Eagles in the 2017 NCAA Division I baseball season. The Eagles played their home games at J. I. Clements Stadium.

Schedule and results
Georgia Southern announced its 2017 football schedule on October 20, 2016. The 2017 schedule consisted of 29 home and 27 away games in the regular season. The Eagles hosted Sun Belts foes Appalachian State, Arkansas State, Little Rock, Louisiana–Monroe, and South Alabama and will travel to Coastal Carolina, Georgia State, Louisiana–Lafayette, Texas–Arlington Mavericks, and Troy.

The 2017 Sun Belt Conference Championship was contested May 24–28 in Statesboro, Georgia, and was hosted by the Eagles.

Georgia Southern finished 3rd in the east division of the conference which qualified the Eagles to compete in the tournament as the 5th seed for the team's 1st Sun Belt Conference tournament title.

 Rankings are based on the team's current  ranking in the Collegiate Baseball poll.

References

Georgia Southern
Georgia Southern Eagles baseball seasons